Charles William Miller (24 November 1874 – 30 June 1953) was a Brazilian sportsman, who is considered to be the father of football in Brazil.

Early life
He was born in São Paulo to John Miller, a Scottish railway engineer and Brazilian mother of English descent, Carlota Fox.

In 1884 he was sent to the Banister Court public school in Southampton, England where he learnt to play football and cricket. Whilst at school, he played for and against both the Corinthians and St. Mary's (now Southampton FC). He was recorded in the 1891 United Kingdom census whilst a boarder at Millbrook School.

Influence
When he returned to Brazil in 1894, Miller brought two footballs and a set of Hampshire FA rules in his suitcase. Miller was instrumental in setting up the football team of the São Paulo Athletic Club (SPAC) and the Liga Paulista, the first football league in Brazil. With him as striker SPAC won the first three championships in 1902, 1903 and 1904.

By 1906, Miller was playing in goal and as such participated in SPAC's heaviest defeat, 9–1 to Sport Club Internacional of São Paulo (not to be confused with Sport Club Internacional). After the result SPAC resigned from the league as did Miller from its directorate. SPAC eventually came back in 1907, even winning the 1911 title, and continued competing in the Campeonato Paulista until 1912, when it withdrew from official competitions.

It was Miller who suggested the name to the first President of Sport Club Corinthians Paulista.

Personal life

Miller worked at the São Paulo Railway Company, becoming the Royal Mail's agent and Acting British Vice-Consul in 1904. He invested in the construction of garden suburbs in São Paulo, designed by Barry Parker and Raymond Unwin, profiting considerably.

In January 1906, he married the renowned pianist Antonietta Rudge, with whom he had two children, Carlos (b. 1907) and Helena (b. 1909). In the late 1920s the couple split and Antonietta moved in with the poet Menotti Del Picchia.

In 1939, on perhaps his last return to England, he was nearly killed in the first IRA bombing on the mainland; his daughter stopped to window shop just seconds before the bomb went off on the steps to the nearby underground station.

He continued to play cricket and golf in later life.  He died on 30 June 1953 in São Paulo, and is buried in the Protestant cemetery there.

See also 
Oscar Cox
Henry Welfare

Sources
Lacey, Josh (2007) God Is Brazilian: Charles Miller, the Man Who Brought Football To Brazil. NPI Media Group.

References

External links

Cricket career (Brazil)
Cricket career (England)
Charles Miller: Patron Saint of Brazil (Southampton FC)

1874 births
1953 deaths
20th-century Brazilian people
Brazilian people of Scottish descent
Brazilian people of English descent
Founders of association football institutions
Southampton F.C. players
Corinthian F.C. players
São Paulo Athletic Club players
Brazilian football referees
Brazilian footballers
Brazilian rugby union players
Association football forwards
Association football goalkeepers